Jimmy Bageya is a Ugandan striker who turned out for Kenyan Premier League side Nairobi City Stars.

Career
Bageya formerly turned out for Kenyan Premier League sides Gor Mahia F.C., A.F.C. Leopards, Bandari F.C. (Kenya), Nakumatt FC and Kakamega Homeboyz F.C.. He has also played club football for Police FC (Uganda), Electrogaz (Rwanda), BDF (Botswana), Krabi FC (Thailand) and NAPSA Stars (Zambia).

Honours

Club
Nairobi City Stars
National Super League
 Champions (1): 2019-20

Individual
Nairobi City Stars
Kenyan Premier League
 Player of the month (1): Oct 2015

References

External links

Living people

Year of birth missing (living people)
Nairobi City Stars players
Kenyan footballers
Kenyan Premier League players
A.F.C. Leopards players
Gor Mahia F.C. players
Bandari F.C. (Kenya) players
Kakamega Homeboyz F.C. players
NAPSA Stars F.C. players